Jnana yoga, also known as the jnana marga, is one of the three classical paths (margas) for moksha (liberation) in Hinduism, which emphasizes the "path of knowledge", also known as the "path of self-realization". The other two are karma yoga (path of action, karma-mārga) and bhakti yoga (path of loving devotion to a personal god, bhakti-mārga). Modern interpretations of Hindu texts have yielded systems, techniques and formulations such as raja yoga and kriya yoga.

The jñāna yoga is a spiritual practice that pursues knowledge with questions such as "who am I, what am I" among others. The practitioner studies usually with the aid of a guru, meditates, reflects, and reaches liberating insights on the nature of one's own Self (Atman, soul) and its relationship to the metaphysical concept called Brahman in Hinduism. The jñāna-mārga ideas are discussed in ancient and medieval era Hindu scriptures and texts such as the Upanishads and the Bhagavad Gita.

Etymology
Jñāna, sometimes transcribed as gyaan, means "knowledge" in Sanskrit. The root jñā- is cognate to English know, as well as to the Greek γνώ- (as in γνῶσις gnosis). Its antonym is ajñāna "ignorance".

Definition

Jnana is knowledge, which refers to any cognitive event that is correct and true over time. It particularly refers to knowledge inseparable from the total experience of its object, especially about reality (non-theistic schools) or supreme being (theistic schools). In Hinduism, it is knowledge which gives Moksha, or spiritual liberation while alive (jivanmukti) or after death (videhamukti). According to Bimal Matilal, jnana yoga in Advaita Vedanta connotes both primary and secondary sense of its meaning, that is "self-consciousness, awareness" in the absolute sense and relative "intellectual understanding" respectively.

According to Jones and Ryan, jnana in jnana yoga context is better understood as "realization or gnosis", referring to a "path of study" wherein one knows the unity between self and ultimate reality called Brahman in Hinduism. This explanation is found in the ancient Upanishads and the Bhagavad Gita.

Jñāna yoga is the path towards attaining jnana. It is one of the three classical types of yoga mentioned in Hindu philosophies, the other two being karma yoga and bhakti. In modern classifications, classical yoga, being called Raja yoga, is mentioned as a fourth one, an extension introduced by Swami Vivekananda.

Of the three different paths to liberation, jnana marga and karma marga are the more ancient, traceable to Vedic era literature. All three paths are available to any seeker, chosen based on inclination, aptitude and personal preference, and typically elements of all three to varying degrees are practiced by many Hindus.

Classical yoga emphasizes the practice of dhyana (meditation), and this is a part of all three classical paths in Hinduism, including jñāna yoga. The path of knowledge is intended for those who prefer philosophical reflection and it requires study and meditation.

Jnana yoga encourages its adepts to think and speak of themselves in the third person as a way to distance themselves from the Ego and detach their eternal self (atman) from the body related one (maya).

Upanishads
In the Upanishads, 'jnana yoga aims at the realization of the oneness of the individual self (Atman) and the ultimate Self (Brahman). These teachings are found in the early Upanishads. According to Chambliss, the mystical teachings within these Upanishads discuss "the way of knowledge of the Self", a union, the realization that the Self (Atman) and the Brahman are logical.

The teachings in the Upanishads have been interpreted in a number of ways, ranging from non-theistic monism to theistic dualism. In former, rituals are not necessary and a path of introspection and meditation is emphasized for the correct knowledge (jnana) of self. In latter, it is the full and correct knowledge of a Vishnu avatar or Shiva or Shakti (Goddess) that is emphasized. In all its various interpretations, the paths are not necessarily mutually exclusive. A Jnana yogi may also practice Karma yoga or Bhakti yoga or both, and differing levels of emphasis.

According to Robert Roeser, the precepts of Jnana yoga in Hinduism were likely systematized by about 500 BCE, earlier than Karma yoga and Bhakti yoga.

Bhagavad Gita  
In the Bhagavad Gita, jnana yoga is also referred to as buddhi yoga and its goal is self-realization. The text considers jnana marga as the most difficult, slow, confusing for those who prefer it because it deals with "formless reality", the avyakta. It is the path that intellectually oriented people tend to prefer.

The chapter 4 of the Bhagavad Gita is dedicated to the general exposition of jnana yoga, while chapters 7 and 16 discuss its theological and axiological aspects. Krishna says that jñāna is the purest, and a discovery of one's Atman:

Traditions
The Advaita philosopher Adi Shankara gave primary importance to jñāna yoga for the "knowledge of the absolute" (Brahman), while the Vishishtadvaita commentator Ramanujar regarded knowledge only as a condition of devotion.

Classical Advaita Vedanta

Behaviors
Classical Advaita Vedanta emphasises the path of Jnana Yoga to attain moksha. It consists of fourfold attitudes, or behavioral qualifications:
 Discrimination ( (नित्यानित्य वस्तु विवेकम्), or simply viveka) — The ability to correctly discriminate (viveka) between the unchanging, permanent, eternal (nitya) and the changing, transitory, temporary (anitya).
 Dispassion of fruits ( (इहाऽमुत्रार्थ फल भोगविरागम्), or simply viraga) — The dispassionate indifference (virāga) to the fruits, to enjoyments of objects (artha phala bhoga) or to the other worlds (amutra) after rebirth.
 Six virtues ( (शमादि षट्क सम्पत्ति), or simply satsampat) — 
 Śama, temperance of mind
 Dama, temperance of sense organs (voluntary self restraints)
 Uparati, withdrawal of mind from sensory objects 
 Titikṣa, forbearance
 Śraddhā, faith
 Samādhāna, concentration of mind
 Drive, longing ( (मुमुक्षुत्वम्)) — intense yearning for moksha from the state of ignorance

Practices
Jnanayoga for Advaitins consists of three practices: sravana (hearing), manana (thinking) and nididhyasana (meditation). This three-step methodology is rooted in the teachings of chapter 4 of the Brihadaranyaka Upanishad:
Sravana literally means hearing, and broadly refers to perception and observations typically aided by a counsellor or teacher (guru), wherein the Advaitin listens and discusses the ideas, concepts, questions and answers.
Manana refers to thinking on these discussions and contemplating over the various ideas based on svadhyaya and sravana.
Nididhyāsana refers to meditation, realization and consequent conviction of the truths, non-duality and a state where there is a fusion of thought and action, knowing and being.

These practices, with the help of a guru are believed to lead to correct knowledge, which destroys avidya, psychological and perceptual errors related to Atman and Brahman.

Shaivism
Both the theistic and monistic streams of Shaivism include jnana yoga ideas, along with those related to karma yoga, and in the case of Saiva Siddhanta ideas related to bhakti yoga. The Shaivism traditions do not consider renunciation necessary for practicing jnana yoga, leaving ascetic yogi lifestyle optional. Spirituality can be pursued along with active life (karma), according to Shaiva traditions, and it believes that this does not hinder ones ability to journey towards self (Shiva within) realization. The traditions dwell into this integration of karma yoga with jnana yoga, such as by ranking daily behavior and activity that is done by choice and when not necessary as higher in spiritual terms than activity that is impulsive or forced.

The methodology of sravana, manana and nididhyasana similar to Advaita Vedanta are also found in various traditions of Shaivism. However, nistha or samadhi is sometimes added in Shaiva methodology. The meditational aspects of Shaivism focus on the nirguna form of Supreme Reality (Shiva).

Vaishnavism
The Pancharatra (agama) texts of Vaishnavism, along with its Bhagavata (Krishna, Rama, Vishnu) tradition, are strongly influenced by jnana yoga ideas of the Upanishads. However, Vaishnavism also incorporates Bhakti yoga concepts of loving devotion to the divine Supreme personally selected by the devotee, in saguna form, both in silent meditational and musical expressive styles.

The aim of jnana yoga in Vaishnavism differs from that in other schools. Advaita, for example, considers jnana yoga as the path to nondual self-knowledge and moksha. Vaishnavism, in contrast, considers it a condition of devotion.

Shaktism
The Shaktism literature on goddess such as Kularnava Tantra highlight jnana marga as important to liberation. It differentiates between two kinds of jnana: one it calls knowledge that comes from Agama texts, and another it calls viveka (insight). The Shaktism literature then adds that both lead to the knowledge of Brahman, but the first one is in the form of sound (shabdabrahman), while the insight from within is the ultimate truth (parabrahman).

Some Shakta texts, such as the Sita Upanishad, combine yoga of action and knowledge as a path to liberation. The Devi Gita, a classic text of Shaktism, dedicates chapter 4 to Jnana yoga, stating that a Jnana yogi understands and realizes that there is no difference between the individual soul and herself as the supreme Self. The discussion of Jnana yoga continues through the later chapters of the Devi Gita.

See also

 Bhakti yoga
 Diamond Sutra Perfection of Wisdom
 Kevala Jnana
 Ramana Maharshi
 Vedanta
 Yoga Vasistha
 Vivekachudamani
 Yoga Sutras of Patanjali

Notes

References

Sources
Printed sources

  (Fourth revised and enlarged edition).
 
 
 
  (Unabridged, New Format Edition).
 
 
 
 
 
 
 
 

Web-sources

Indian philosophy
Yoga paths